

Government buildings

 Bhalswa Landfill or the Legacy Landfill Site is a highest garbage structure after Qutub Minar designed by the Municipal Corporation of Delhi from 1985 - till dated. The construction is char-bagh style (four garbage pillars at four corner) with a Dome shaped garbage mountain structure in the middle. Its circumference is guided by Black Garbage water splashing all around on the roads from the landfill. Municipal Corporation of Delhi is determined to make it the highest structure of India, so that foreign tourists comes to visit this marvelous garbage of Delhi and contribute to the income of Government. The Bhalswa Landfill Site is considered as the most attractive tourist attraction for foreign guests coming for G20 Summit in India in 2023.
 Sansad Bhavan or the Parliament of India is a circular building designed by the British architects Sir Edwin Lutyens and Sir Herbert Baker in 1912–1913. Construction began in 1921, and in 1927 the building was opened as the home of the Council of State, the Central Legislative Assembly, and the Chamber of Princes.
 Rashtrapati Bhavan Built with a mix of European and Mughal/Indian styles, Rashtrapati Bhavan was originally built for the Governor General of India. Inaugurated in 1931 as the Viceregal Lodge, the name was changed in 1959 after India became a republic. Now it is the Presidential Palace of India.

Connaught Place

Connaught Place also known as CP is a business and commercial centre with hotels, shopping complexes, and offices. Tourist attractions include Hanuman Mandir, an ancient temple with a mention in Guinness Book of Record, Jantar Mantar, an astronomical observatory from the 18th century, Maharaja Agrasen ki Baoli and State Emporiums which houses a collection of ethnic specialities of the states.

Connaught Place is divided into two circles, called the inner and outer Connaught circle. Janpath, an open-air shopping complex, lies on the road connecting the inner and outer circle with Palika Bazaar, a landmark market in the underground maze below Connaught Place.

Historic Sites 

 The Qutub Minar is located in Qutb complex, Mehrauli in South Delhi. It was built by Qutub-ud-din Aibak of the Slave Dynasty, founder of the Delhi Sultanate, started construction of the Qutub Minar's first storey around 1192. In 1220, Aibak's successor and son-in-law Iltutmish completed a further three storeys. In 1369, a lightning strike destroyed the top storey. Firoz Shah Tughlaq replaced the damaged storey and added one more. It is a fluted red sandstone tower, which tapers up to a height of 72.5 meters and is covered with intricate carvings and verses from the Quran.
 Lodhi Gardens, earlier called Lady Willingdon Park is a 15th and 16th-century park with numerous monuments scattered among its lawns, flowers, shady trees and ponds. Notable monuments are Tomb of Sikandar Lodi, Bara Gumbad and Shisha Gumbad.
 When Ghazi Malik founded the Tughlaq Dynasty in 1321, he built the strongest fort in Delhi at Tughlaqabad, completed with great speed within four years of his rule.
 Salimgarh Fort, which is now part of the Red Fort complex, was constructed on an island of the Yamuna River in 1546 by the Suri Dynasty.
 The Purana Quila (Old Fort) is a very good example of Mughal military architecture. Built by Pandavas, renovated by Humayun, with later modifications by Sher Shah Suri, the Purana Quila is a monument that is different from the well-planned, carefully decorated, and palatial forts of the later Mughal rulers. It does not have a complex of palaces, administrative, and recreational buildings as is generally found in the forts built later on but rather has plain design and sturdy strong walls that were meant to defend it from attacks.
 Chandni Chowk, a main marketplace in Delhi, keeps alive the city's living legacy of Shahjahanabad. It is a very famous place in Delhi it is famous for its Jalebi and Parathas. Chandni Chowk remains Asia's largest wholesale market. Created by Shah Jahan, legend has it that Shah Jahan planned Chandni Chowk so that his daughter could shop for all that she wanted. Handicrafts once patronized by the Mughals continue to flourish there. Within the vicinity are the Laal Quila (The Red Fort), Fatehpuri Mosque and Jama Masjid along with Sis Ganj Gurudwara, Gauri Shankar Mandir, Jain Mandir and a lot of small temples, the place is witnesses of genuine cultural harmony.
 The Safdarjung's Tomb is a garden tomb in a marble mausoleum.
 Humayun's tomb is the tomb of the Mughal emperor Humayun that was commissioned by Humayun's wife and chief consort, Empress Bega Begum in 1569. It is a UNESCO World Heritage Site.
 Red Fort is a historic fort in Delhi where every year on the Independence day of India (15 August), the Prime Minister hoists the Indian "tricolour flag" at the main gate of the fort and delivers a nationally broadcast speech from its ramparts.
 The Jantar Mantar consists of 13 architectural astronomy instruments, built by Maharaja Jai Singh II.
 The Siri Fort is a historic fort located between Mehrauli and Hauz Khas, and was built during the rule of Alauddin Khilji. 
 Iron Pillar, a 7.21 meters tall metallurgical wonder, is located in Qutb complex.

Places of worship

Hinduism 

 Akshardham Temple it is the third largest Hindu temple in the world. It was built in 2005. In the sprawling  land rests an intricately carved monument, high-technology exhibitions, a musical fountain, a food court and gardens.
 The Laxminarayan Temple is built in honour of Lakshmi (Hindu goddess of wealth), and her consort Narayana (Vishnu, Preserver in the Trimurti) by B. R. Birla from 1933 and 1939, when it was inaugurated by Mahatma Gandhi. The side temples are dedicated to Shiva, Krishna and Buddha. The temple spread over 7.5 acres, is adorned with many shrines, fountains, and a large garden, and also houses Geeta Bhawan for discourses. The temple is one of the major attractions of Delhi and attracts thousands of devotees on the Hindu festivals of Janmashtami and Holi.
 ISKCON Temple also popularly called as the Hare Krishna temple is a famous Vaishnava temple with deities of Sri Radha Krishna. Located in South Delhi, the construction of the temple began in 1991 and was completed in 1998 under the planning of internationally renowned architect Achyut Kanvinde.  The temple primarily built with red stone is recognized for its unique architecture which blends the traditional Vedic with contemporary style. The complex also houses a one of a kind in the country Robtic show which explains the message of Bhagavad Gita. Another highlight of the temple is beautifully drawn paintings of the Lord done by the foreign devotees. Apart from these, the temple acts as a sturdy base for those wish to study the Vedic scriptures, Yoga and provides a facility for practising Bhakti Yoga as given by Srila Prabhupada. The temple also serves the devotees pure vegetarian food at its 'Govindas' restaurant. The temple is easy to approach as it well connected by buses and Metro trains. .
 Chhatarpur Temple is located at Chhatarpur, is the second-largest temple complex in India, and is dedicated to Goddess, Katyayani
 Kalka Ji Mandir is a famous Hindu mandir or temple, This temple is situated on Kalkaji Mandir (Delhi Metro station) in the southern part of Delhi, India, in Kalkaji, a locality that has derived its name from this famous temple and is located opposite Nehru Place business centre.

Jainism 

 Shri Digambar Jain Lal Mandir is the oldest and best-known Jain temple in Delhi originally built-in 1658. This temple is located just opposite the massive Red Fort at the intersection of Netaji Subhas Marg and Chandni Chowk. The Temple is an impressive structure made up red stone giving the name Lal Mandir. The temple is known for an avian veterinary hospital, called the Jain Birds Hospital, in a second building behind the main temple.
 Shri Atma Vallabh Jain Smarak is a Jain temple and a multi-faceted memorial in the sacred memory of Jain Acharya Shri Vijay Vallabh Surishwer Ji. The main hall of the temple is considered a brilliant example of the structural design as per ancient Jain Sthapatya Kala (Main Sompura: Amrutbhai Mulshankar Trivedi). It is built in dome-shaped internally with stepped roof exterior.

Sikhs 

 Gurdwara Bangla Sahib is one of the most prominent and largest Gurdwaras in Delhi, Gurdwara Bangla Sahib is the most visited one in Delhi. Millions visit this Gurdwara from all over the world and of all religions to offer their prayers at this elegant yet historical Gurdwara in Delhi. The Gurdwara marks the place where the eighth Sikh Guru, Guru Harkrishan lived his last breath serving the helpless population ravaged by smallpox and cholera epidemic. The Gurdwara offers free food (langar) to all visitors and devotees throughout the day. Even one can have its M.R.I. free of cost at Bangla Sahib. These's a beautiful reservoir.Its a place where you can connect your soul with divine.https://gowithharry.com/bangla-sahib/

Islam 

 The Masjid-i-Jahan Numa, commonly known as Jama Masjid, is the principal mosque of Old Delhi. Commissioned by the Mughal Emperor Shah Jahan and completed in the year 1656, it is one of the largest and best-known mosques in India. It can accommodate around 25,000 people at once.
 Nizamuddin Dargah is the Mausoleum of the famous Sufi Saint Nizamuddin Auliya, Delhi.
 Matka Peer Dargah is the Mausoleum of the famous Sufi Saint Sheikh Abu Bakar Tusi, Delhi.

Baháʼí 
 The Lotus Temple is an exceptionally beautiful structure, built as a Baháʼí House of Worship, situated in South Delhi and looks like a white lotus. It was built by the community of the Baháʼí Faith. The Temple has received a wide range of attention in professional architectural, fine art, religious, governmental, and other venues.

Christian 

 Cathedral Church of Redemption, also known as Viceroy Church. Located east of Parliament House and Rashtrapati Bhavan, which was used by then viceroy of British India. The Church derives its name from Palladio's Church of Il Redentore in Venice as well as Lutyens St Jude's Church, Hampstead Garden Suburb. The cathedral was built in eight years and was completed in the year 1935. Cathedral was designed by Henry Medd. Cathedral was built in such a manner that even in the extreme summers it remains cool and serene. The Cathedral Church of the Redemption serves locals and foreigners. It is visited by tens of thousands of visitors each day.
 St. James' Church is one of the oldest churches in Delhi.

Memorials 

 The National War Memorial is a war memorial to India's military.
 The India Gate located astride the Rajpath is a war memorial to 70,000 soldiers of the Indian Army who lost their lives in the First World War.
 The Wall of Truth is a memorial for Sikhs killed during the 1984 anti-Sikh riots and "all Sikhs killed world over in hate crimes".
 The National Police Memorial commemorates police personnel from all of the central and state police forces in India who have died in the line of duty since Independence.
On the banks of the Yamuna River, which flows past Delhi, there is Raj Ghat, the final resting place of Mahatma Gandhi, the father of the nation. It has become an essential point of call for all visiting dignitaries. Two museums dedicated to Gandhi are situated nearby.

Museums

 Ghalib Museum
 Indian War Memorial Museum
 Pradhan Mantri Sangrahalaya
 National Museum
 National Rail Museum
 National Museum of Natural History
 National Philatelic Museum, New Delhi
 Indian Air Force Museum, Palam
 National Gallery of Modern Art
 National Gandhi Museum
 National Handicrafts and Handlooms Museum
 National Police Memorial and Museum
 National Science Centre, New Delhi
 Kiran Nadar Museum of Art
 Parliament Museum
 Red Fort Archaeological Museum
 Shankar's International Dolls Museum
 Sulabh International Museum of Toilets
 Dr. Zakir Hussain Museum

Other attractions
 Delhi is a food lovers paradise, from street food to the Paranthe Wali Gali of old Delhi selling everything from paranthas to nihari, to the modern-day but local cafes that have sprung up, to the Mughlai and North Indian restaurants- Delhi food is its heart and soul. And it requires a huge appetite to sample it all.
 Lying close to the Raj Ghat, the Shanti Van (literally, the forest of peace) is the place where India's first Prime Minister Jawaharlal Nehru was cremated. The area is now a beautiful park adorned by trees planted by visiting dignitaries and heads of state.
 Ahinsa Sthal is a Jain temple located in Mehrauli. This temple is famous for its magnificent 13  ft. 6-inch statue of Mahavira carved from single granite rock.
 Rajpath, constructed by Sir Edwin Lutyens, is a road that runs from Rashtrapati Bhavan and is surrounded by beautiful gardens.

Parks and gardens 

 Garden of Five Senses is a park with numerous modern art and sculpture pieces spread over 20 acres near Saket in south Delhi.
 Waste To Wonder is a park spread over 7 acres in Sarai Kale Khan. It has replicas of 7 wonders of the world made out of 150 tonnes of waste.
 Bharat Darshan Park SDMC is a park spread over 8.5 acres made out of 350 metric tonnes of waste. It opened in December 2021. It was developed by the South Delhi Municipal Corporation (SDMC) in West Delhi's Punjabi Bagh at an estimated cost of ₹ 14 crore and replicas of 21 monuments from across the country.
 Aastha Kunj
 The National Zoological Park  is a 176-acre (71 ha) zoo near the Old Fort in Delhi, India. The zoo is home to about 1350 animals representing almost 130 species of animals and birds from around the world.
 The India Africa Friendship Rose Garden in Chanakyapuri, which has many unique rose varieties
 Millennium Indraprastha Park, located between ITO and Akshardham, is a park with an amphitheatre, food court and a Vishwa Shanti Stupa with Buddha statue.
 Sunder Nursery, a 90 acres heritage park near Humayun's Tomb, is a UNESCO World Heritage Site and has a garden with marble fountains.

Gallery

See also

Tourism in India

Outline of tourism in India

 List of World Heritage Sites in India
 List of national parks of India
 List of lakes of India
 List of waterfalls in India
 List of State Protected Monuments in India
 List of beaches in India
 Incredible India
 List of Geographical Indications in India
 Medical tourism in India
 List of botanical gardens in India
 List of hill stations in India
 List of gates in India
 List of zoos in India
 List of protected areas of India
 List of aquaria in India
 List of forts in India
 List of forests in India
 Buddhist pilgrimage sites in India
 Hindu pilgrimage sites in India
 List of rock-cut temples in India
 Wildlife sanctuaries of India
 List of rivers of India
 List of mountains in India
 List of ecoregions in India
 Coral reefs in India
 List of stadiums in India

References

Further reading

External links
 

 List
 
Delhi
Delhi